Street dance, formally known as vernacular dance, refers to dance styles that evolved outside of dance studios in any available open space.

Street dance, Street Dance or StreetDance may also refer to:

 StreetDance 3D, a British dance film also known as StreetDance in its non-3D version
 Street Dance (song), a 1984 hit single by the American rap act Break Machine